John Charles von Stieglitz (18 November 1844 – 26 May 1916) was an Australian politician.

Von Stieglitz was born in Launceston in Tasmania in 1844. He worked as a surveyor in North Queensland and is believed to have named Thuringowa after his ancestral home of Thuringia. In 1891 he was elected to the Tasmanian House of Assembly, representing the seat of Evandale. He served his seat was abolished in 1903; he was defeated contesting North Esk. He died in 1916 in Hazelbrook, New South Wales.

References

1844 births
1916 deaths
Members of the Tasmanian House of Assembly